Barnaul is the largest city and administrative centre of Altai Krai, Russia, located at the confluence of the Barnaulka and Ob Rivers in the West Siberian Plain. As of the 2021 Census, its population was 630,877, making it the 20th largest city in Russia and the fourth largest in the Siberian Federal District.

Located in the south of western Siberia on the left bank of the Ob River, Barnaul is a major transport, industrial, cultural, medical and educational hub of Siberia. Barnaul was founded by the wealthy Demidov family, who intended to develop the production of copper and silver, which continued after the factories were taken over by the Crown. Barnaul became a major centre of silver production in Russia. Barnaul was granted city status in 1771.

Administrative and municipal status 
Barnaul is the administrative centre of the krai. Within the framework of administrative divisions, it is, together with the work settlement of Yuzhny and twenty-four rural localities, incorporated as the city of krai significance of Barnaul – an administrative unit with the status equal to that of the districts. As a municipal division, the city of krai significance of Barnaul is incorporated as Barnaul Urban Okrug.

Geography 
Barnaul is located in the forest steppe zone of the West Siberian Plain, on the left bank of the Ob River, at its confluence with the Barnaulka.

The city is also situated relatively close to the Russian border with Mongolia and the border with China.

History

Ancient history 
The area around the city has been inhabited by modern humans, Neanderthals and Denisovans, for hundreds of thousands of years. They settled here to take advantage of the confluence of the rivers, used for transportation and fishing. In the late BC millennia, the locality was a centre of activity for Scythian and various Turkic peoples.

Russian Empire 
While 1730 is considered Barnaul's official establishment date, its first mention dates back to 1724. It was granted city status in 1771. Chosen for its proximity to the mineral-rich Altai Mountains and its location on a major river, it was founded by the wealthy Demidov family. The Demidovs wanted to develop the copper in the mountains, and soon found substantial deposits of silver as well. In 1747, the Demidovs' factories were taken over by the Crown. Barnaul became the centre of silver production of the Russian Empire.

In 1914, Barnaul was the site of the largest conscription riot in Russia during World War I. There were more than 100 casualties from the fighting.

Maria Stepanovna (née Zudilova) (1912–1996) was born and lived as a child in this city. She later became the mother of American actresses Natalie Wood (born Natalia Zakharenko) and Lana Wood (born Lana Gurdin). Her father Stepan was killed in the 1918 street fighting between the Whites and Reds following the Revolution. Afterward her mother took Maria and her siblings as refugees to Harbin, China. Maria married a Russian there, and they had a daughter Olga together. Maria eventually immigrated with Olga to the United States, where she married another Russian immigrant, from Vladivostok, and had two daughters with him.

World War II 
Over half of the light ammunition used by the Soviet Union in World War II is estimated to have been manufactured in Barnaul.

Economy 
Barnaul is an important industrial centre of Western Siberia. There are more than 100 industrial enterprises in the city, employing approximately 120,000 people. Leading industries include diesel and carbon processing; as well as production of heavy machinery, tyres, furniture and footwear.

Transportation 
Barnaul is located on the South Siberian, Turk–Sib and Omsk–Barnaul railway lines.
Barnaul has public transport of Bus, Trolley and Taxies. Barnaul International Airport is located 16 kilometres West of the city center. It is served by airlines such as Aeroflot, S7, Nordwind, Iraero and Ural Airlines. It has regular flights to Moscow, Novosibirsk, St. Petersburg and Surgut.

Climate 
Temperatures can vary in the extreme, from below  in the winter to above  in the summer.

The climate is relatively dry. This means snow packs can be quite moderate in spite of the cold temperatures.

Notable people 
 Alexander von Bunge, botanist, worked in Barnaul
 Maria Butina, alleged agent of the US, and member of the State Duma
 Pyotr Kozmitch Frolov, scientist and inventor
 Tatyana Kotova, Olympic champion in long jump
 Julia Neigel, singer, songwriter
 Ivan Nifontov, World champion and Olympic medalist in Judo
 Alexey Novikov-Priboy, writer
 Ivan Polzunov, inventor, creator of the first two-cylinder engine in the world
 Anastasiia Salos, European and world medalist rhythmic gymnast
 Konstantin Scherbakov, pianist
 Sergey Shubenkov, track and field athlete, 2015 world champion
 Nadezhda Shuvayeva-Olkhova, Olympic champion in basketball
 Alexey Smertin, former captain of the Russia national football team
 Rita Streich, coloratura soprano
 Andrei Svechnikov, professional NHL ice hockey player
 Evgeny Svechnikov, professional NHL and KHL ice hockey player
 Nikolai Yadrintsev, explorer and archeologist, discoveries include the Orkhon script, Genghis Khan's capital, Karakorum
 Mikhail Yakubov, NHL and KHL professional ice hockey player
 Mikhail Yevdokimov, comedian and former governor of Altai Krai
 Maxim Zimin, racing driver
 Kirill Marchenko, NHL professional ice hockey player

Twin towns – sister cities 

Barnaul is twinned with:

 Baicheng, China
 Changji, China
 Flagstaff, United States
 Oskemen, Kazakhstan
 Shumen, Bulgaria

See also 
 Nagorny Park
 Tsentralny City District, Barnaul

References

Sources

External links 
 
 
 Official website of Barnaul 
 Directory of organizations in Barnaul 

 
Populated places on the Ob River
Cities and towns in Altai Krai
Tomsk Governorate
Populated places established in 1730